Roseland Township may refer to the following townships in the United States:

 Roseland Township, Kandiyohi County, Minnesota
 Roseland Township, Adams County, Nebraska